Chiesanuova is a comune (municipality) in the Metropolitan City of Turin in the Italian region Piedmont, located about  north of Turin.

Chiesanuova borders the following municipalities: Frassinetto, Pont Canavese, Borgiallo, and Cuorgnè.

References

Cities and towns in Piedmont